The Regulatory Reform (Fire Safety) Order 2005 (officially listed as The Regulatory Reform (Fire Safety) Order 2005 S.I. 2005 No. 1541) is a statutory instrument applicable in England and Wales. The Order places the responsibility on individuals within an organisation to carry out risk assessments to identify, manage and reduce the risk of fire. The Order was made into law on 7 June 2005 and came into force on 1 October 2006.

Guidance for businesses is available in the form of 16 government-published documents, with general guidance, a 5-Step Checklist and 12 documents pertaining specifically to a particular type of business premises. On 5 January 2016, responsibility for fire and rescue policy transferred from the Department for Communities and Local Government to the Home Office, who then became responsible for the guidance. The guidance does not normally apply to domestic premises.

Prior to the Order, under the Fire Precautions Act 1971, all public and commercial buildings, and all non-single-household domestic dwellings (apart from houses in multiple occupation), were required to hold a valid fire safety certificate issued annually after an inspection by the Fire Service. This regime was replaced with assessment by third-party fire-risk assessors contracted by building owners and landlords, with no mandated timeframe for checks, and no mandated professional qualifications.

In 2013, the Fire Service found that 14% of risk assessments were non-compliant with the law, and in 2018 it was found that 500 out of 800 of the UK's fire risk assessors were not registered with accredited bodies.

Guides
The guides available are:
Do you have paying guests?
Fire safety risk assessment: animal premises and stables
Fire safety risk assessment: means of escape for disabled people
Fire safety risk assessment: open-air events and venues
Fire safety risk assessment: transport premises and facilities
Fire safety risk assessment: healthcare premises
Fire safety risk assessment: residential care premises
Fire safety risk assessment: theatres, cinemas and similar premises
Making your premises safe from fire
Fire safety risk assessment: 5-step checklist
Fire safety risk assessment: factories and warehouses
Fire safety risk assessment: large places of assembly
Fire safety risk assessment: small and medium places of assembly
Fire safety risk assessment: educational premises
Fire safety risk assessment: sleeping accommodation
Fire safety risk assessment: offices and shops

See also
 Fire services in the United Kingdom

References 

5. Fire Safety Risk Assessment UK accessed 20 September 2022

External links
 The Regulatory Reform (Fire Safety) Order 2005

Fire and rescue in the United Kingdom
Statutory Instruments of the United Kingdom
2005 in British law
Fire protection